Romanaria chachapoyas is a species of moth of the family Tortricidae. It is found in Peru.

The wingspan is 18 mm. The ground colour of the forewings is white with small blackish dots and pinkish-grey suffusions at the markings in the median part of the wing and at the mid-termen. The markings are black. The hindwings are greyish, tinged with brownish towards the termen.

Etymology
The species name refers to the type locality, Chachapoyas Province.

References

Moths described in 2010
Euliini
Taxa named by Józef Razowski
Moths of South America